Gavin Hyman is Senior Lecturer at the University of Lancaster. He read Theology at Peterhouse, Cambridge and the University of Exeter. He has published on postmodernism, philosophy and theology, radical orthodoxy, atheism, and ethics.

Works authored 
The Predicament of Postmodern Theology: Radical Orthodoxy or Nihilist Textualism?, Westminster: John Knox Press, 2001.

References

External links
Faculty profile

British theologians
Alumni of Peterhouse, Cambridge
Alumni of the University of Exeter
Living people
Year of birth missing (living people)
Academics of Lancaster University